Cristian Martín Arguiñarena Pombo (born 6 September 1991) is a Uruguayan professional footballer who plays as a left-back for Progreso.

Career

Villa Teresa
In 2010, Arguiñarena signed his first senior contract with Uruguayan Segunda División Amateur side Villa Teresa. He played with Villa Teresa for six years, helping the club earn promotion to the Segunda División in 2011 and then to the Primera División in 2015.

In his first season in the Primera División Arguiñarena made 26 appearances for Villa Teresa, scoring three goals.

El Tanque Sisley
In February 2017, Arguiñarena joined El Tanque Sisley ahead of the 2017 Primera División season. That season he made a career-high 35 Primera División appearances.

Boston River
In January 2018, Arguiñarena signed with Boston River. That season he made 22 league appearances, scoring one goal. On 25 July 2018, he made his continental debut in the Copa Sudamericana as an injury time substitute for Boston River in a 1–0 win over Argentinian club Banfield.

Valour FC
Arguiñarena signed a multi-year deal with Canadian Premier League club Valour FC on 25 February 2019. That season, he made eighteen league appearances and two appearances in the Canadian Championship. In January 2020, Valour announced that he had been released from his contract.

Return to Villa Teresa
On 1 February 2020, Arguiñarena signed with Villa Teresa, now in the Uruguayan Segunda División.

Career statistics

References

External links

1991 births
Living people
Association football defenders
Uruguayan footballers
Footballers from Montevideo
Uruguayan expatriate footballers
Expatriate soccer players in Canada
Uruguayan expatriate sportspeople in Canada
Villa Teresa players
El Tanque Sisley players
Boston River players
Valour FC players
Uruguayan Segunda División players
Uruguayan Primera División players
Canadian Premier League players